Marine Research Vessel (MRV) Alba-Na-Mara is a small marine and fisheries research vessel, operated by the Marine Scotland directorate of the Scottish Government. 

Primarily operating in the inshore zone, Alba na Mara collects data on fish, Nephrops and scallop stocks.

History
Alba-Na-Mara was commissioned in 2008. She replaced  which had been in operation with FRS for 40 years.

Layout
Alba-Na-Mara is equipped with a sophisticated range of deck machinery and electronics. She is capable of carrying out fisheries research, single, twin, pelagic/demersal/trawling and scallop dredging, hydrographic sampling, surveying and camera work up to 150 miles offshore.

References

2008 ships
Ships built in Scotland
Research vessels of the United Kingdom